This is a list of notable codices.

For the purposes of this compilation, as in philology, a "codex" is a manuscript book published from the late Antiquity period through the Middle Ages. (The majority of the books in both the list of manuscripts and list of illuminated manuscripts are codices.) More modern works that include "codex" as part of their name are not listed here. The following codices are usually named for their most famous resting-places, such as a city or library.

List

  
Abrogans
Aleppo Codex
Codex Alexandrinus
Al-Ousta Codex
Codices Ambrosiani
Codex Amiatinus
Codex Argenteus
Arnamagnæan Manuscript Collection
Codex Arundel
Codex Astensis
Codex Atlanticus
Codex Augiensis
Auraicept na n-Éces
Codex Aureus of Echternach
Codex Aureus of Lorsch
Codex Aureus of St. Emmeram
Book of Ballymote
Berlin Codex
Boxer Codex
Codex Bezae
Codex Boernerianus
Codex Borbonicus
Aztec codices#Boturini Codex
Carmina Burana
Codex Cairensis
Codex Calixtinus
Codex Claromontanus
 Maya codices (Cortesianus Codex)
Codex Cumanicus
Damascus Pentateuch
De arte venandi cum avibus
Dresden Codex
Codex Ebnerianus
Codex Ephraemi Rescriptus
Codex Eyckensis
Exeter Book
Flateyjarbók
Codex Gigas
Codex Grandior
Codex Hierosolymitanus
Hildegard of Bingen#Works
Hitda Codex
Hypatian Codex
In Lebor Ogaim
Book of Kells
Codex Koridethi
Lebor Gabála Érenn
Lebor na gCeart
Codex Leicester
Leningrad Codex
Cologne Mani-Codex
Madrid Codex (Maya)
Codex Manesse
Matenadaran MS 7117
Codex Mendoza
Morgan Bible
Nag Hammadi library
Novgorod Codex
Nowell Codex
Nürnberger Handschrift GNM 3227a
Paris Codex
Peterborough Chronicle
Codex Pisanus
Codex Rabbulensis
Codex Regius
Codex Rehdigerianus
Rohonc Codex
Codex Quetzalecatzin
Codex Runicus
Codex Sangallensis 878
Codex Sinaiticus
Codex Suprasliensis
Codex Tchacos
 Maya codices (Troano Codex)
Codex Usserianus Primus
Codex Vaticanus Graecus 1209
Codex Vigilanus
Codex Vindobonensis 795
Codex Vindobonensis B 11093
Codex Wallerstein
Chronicle of Henry of Livonia (Codex Zamoscianus)
Codex Zouche-Nuttall

Notes and references

List
Codices
Textual scholarship